Abbeyfield School may refer to:

Abbeyfield School, Chippenham, a secondary school in Wiltshire, England
Abbeyfield School, Northampton, a secondary school in Northamptonshire, England